Kasey Remel Palmer (born 9 November 1996) is a professional footballer who plays as a midfielder for Championship club Coventry City. Born in England, he represented England up to U21 level and currently represents the Jamaica national team.

Club career

Chelsea
Palmer joined Charlton Athletic at the age of nine, and featured for the club for the majority of his youth career. Having represented his nation at youth level, Palmer attracted interest from Chelsea and made the move in March 2013. Due to their academy status, the Blues were able to sign Palmer for only a small compensation fee.

Making a handful of appearances for the Under-18s during the remainder of his inaugural season, Palmer became an influential figure in Adi Viveash's side for the 2013–14 while making sporadic appears from the bench for the Under-19s and Under-21s.

His first success came with the Under-21s, when he made appearances in the semi-final and final of the end-of-season playoffs before Dermot Drummy's team were named league champions. He later featured as a substitute in every round of the club's successful FA Youth Cup campaign while netting twice.

He also played in all four UEFA Youth League knockout ties, while scoring against Zenit St Petersburg in the second round before the Blues lifted the cup. The 2015–16 season also proved successful for Palmer, who scored three goals in five matches as they retained their crown.

Tipped as one of the academy's most promising talents, Palmer signed a new contract in February 2016, which committed his future to the club until the end of the 2018–19 season. He was given his first taste of senior football under manager Guus Hiddink, being named as an unused substitute against Swansea City in April 2016.

Loan to Huddersfield Town
On 15 July 2016, Palmer joined Huddersfield Town on a season-long loan. He made his professional debut on 6 August, replacing Jack Payne in the 78th minute of a 2–1 win over Brentford. Palmer scored the winning goal after a minute on the pitch with just his second touch of the ball. In the following league game against Newcastle United, Palmer once again came off the bench in the second-half, where he went on to set up Payne to score the winner with a through-ball to earn their second straight win. After an extended period out through injury, Palmer returned to action in the Championship play-off final as Huddersfield won promotion to the Premier League.

On 3 July 2017, Palmer signed a contract extension with Chelsea tying him to the club until 2021. A day later, Palmer's loan spell at Huddersfield Town was extended for a further season. On 2 January 2018, Palmer announced via Twitter that he would be leaving Huddersfield following the termination of his loan, after only featuring in five games all season.

Loan to Derby County
On 31 January 2018, Palmer joined Championship side Derby County on loan for the remainder of the campaign. He scored his first goal for Derby in a 2–2 draw against Leeds United on 21 February 2018.

Loan to Blackburn Rovers
On 30 July 2018, Palmer joined Championship side Blackburn Rovers on a season-long loan.

Loan to Bristol City
In January 2019 he moved on loan to Bristol City. In his first game he came off of the bench to score on his debut in a 2–1 win against Bolton Wanderers.

Bristol City
On 1 August 2019, Palmer signed for Bristol City on a 4-year deal for a fee believed to be around £3.5 million. He stated that the main reasons for joining were to gain more stability and play under manager Lee Johnson.

Loan to Swansea City
On 16 October 2020, Palmer joined fellow Championship side Swansea City on a season-long loan. He scored his first goal for Swansea in a 2–0 win over Stoke City on 27 October 2020. On 5 January 2021, Palmer was recalled from this loan spell by his parent club Bristol City.

Coventry City 

On 21 June 2022, it was announced that Palmer had signed for Championship club Coventry City for an undisclosed fee. Palmer signed a three-year deal and Coventry manager Mark Robins described him as "a player with great technical and creative ability who we are excited to be working with".

International career
Palmer made his debut for England Under-17s on 8 February 2013, playing for seven minutes in a 2–1 defeat to Germany. His second appearance came just two days later when England suffered another 2–1 defeat, this time to Portugal. His final appearance for the Under-17s came later that week when he came off the bench in a 1–0 defeat to the Netherlands.

He has also made a single appearance for England Under-18s on 14 October 2013. Palmer played 73 minutes of a 4–0 win over Hungary, which was his first international match played in his home country.

After impressive displays for his club, Palmer received his first Under-20 call-up two and a half years after his previous international appearance. He played 45 minutes in a 2–1 defeat to Canada on 27 March 2016 and marked his debut with his nation's only goal of the game.

In May 2016, Palmer was part of the England Under-21 squad crowned champions of the 2016 Toulon Tournament.

In March 2021 he was one of eight English-born players to receive their first call-up to the Jamaica national team. He made his full international debut in a 4–1 loss to the United States on 25 March 2021.

Career statistics

Club

International

Honours
Chelsea
Under-21 Premier League: 2013–14
FA Youth Cup: 2013–14, 2014–15
UEFA Youth League: 2014–15, 2015–16

Huddersfield Town
EFL Championship play-offs: 2017

England U21
Toulon Tournament: 2016

References

External links
England profile at The FA

1996 births
Living people
Footballers from Lewisham
Jamaican footballers
Jamaica international footballers
English footballers
England youth international footballers
English people of Jamaican descent
Association football midfielders
Chelsea F.C. players
Huddersfield Town A.F.C. players
Derby County F.C. players
Blackburn Rovers F.C. players
English Football League players
Premier League players
Black British sportspeople
Bristol City F.C. players
Swansea City A.F.C. players